James Andrew Teilborg (born December 29, 1942) is a senior United States district judge of the United States District Court for the District of Arizona.

Education and career

Born in Pueblo, Colorado, Teilborg received a Juris Doctor from the University of Arizona College of Law in 1966. He was in private practice in Phoenix, Arizona from 1967 to 2000. He served in the Air National Guard from 1966 to 1974, and was then a Colonel in the United States Air Force Reserve from 1974 to 1997.

Federal judicial service

On July 21, 2000, Teilborg was nominated by President Bill Clinton to a new seat on the United States District Court for the District of Arizona created by 113 Stat. 1501. He was confirmed by the United States Senate on October 3, 2000, and received his commission on October 13, 2000. He took senior status on January 30, 2013.

References

Sources

1942 births
Living people
Arizona lawyers
James E. Rogers College of Law alumni
Judges of the United States District Court for the District of Arizona
People from Pueblo, Colorado
United States Air Force reservists
United States district court judges appointed by Bill Clinton
20th-century American judges
21st-century American judges